John Tate is a former councillor and Lord Mayor of the City of Newcastle in New South Wales, Australia.

Tate was originally elected as a councillor of the City of Newcastle in September 1980, and was elected Lord Mayor in 1999, continuing in that role until 2012.

Tate ran as an independent candidate for the electoral district of Newcastle in the 2007 state election but narrowly lost to Labor candidate Jodi McKay, a former NBN Television reporter.

Tate re-contested the Lord Mayoral position at the September 2008 New South Wales Local Government Elections as an independent candidate out-polling his rivals with 32% compared to Independent Aaron Buman with 18.6% and Australian Labor Party candidate Marilyn Eade with 18.4%.

Tate contested the electorate of Newcastle again at the 2011 New South Wales election. He came fourth, with Tim Owen from the Liberal Party winning the seat.

Responding to revelations in May 2014 at the Independent Commission Against Corruption about the possibly corrupt funding of election campaigns in the electorate of Newcastle in 2011, by businesses associated with Nathan Tinkler, Tate said he had never received any financial assistance from Tinkler or any entity connected with him.

References

See also:
NSW Electoral Commission, Mayoral Election 2009
NSW Electoral Commission, Third Ward Election 2009
NSW 2007 State election results, Newcastle
Newcastle City Council website/ Lord Mayor

Mayors and Lord Mayors of Newcastle
New South Wales local councillors
Living people
Year of birth missing (living people)